Taekwondo has been a part of the Pan American Games since 1987 edition in Indianapolis, United States, but only for men. Women's competition debuted at the 1995 Pan American Games in Mar del Plata, Argentina.

Medal table
Updated until 2019 edition.

References

 
Sports at the Pan American Games
Pan American Games